The 1970–71 Pittsburgh Condors season was the 1st season of the Pittsburgh Condors, and third overall season of Pittsburgh's tenure in American Basketball Association. Haven Industries (makers of the Jack Frost sugar brand) had bought the team after the previous season and they decided to rename the team. With the prize being $500, the winning selection was "Pioneers". However, Point Park College, a NAIA college near the team offices threatened legal action due to them already using the nickname for their team. The pro team hastily came up with a replacement name in the form of "Condors", with the first game of the season being on October 15, 1970 versus the New York Nets, which they won 105–102. However, only 3,616 attended the game, a harbinger of things to come. For the November 17th game vs the Floridians, GM Marty Blake tried to spur interest by giving away all available tickets for free. Of the 13,000 seats offered, 8,074 fans showed up. Later in the year, he was fired when the team was 10 games below .500, alongside management being tired of promotional gimmicks.

On March 6, 1971, Stew Johnson scored 62 points versus the Floridians, going 25 of 44 with one three-pointer made and 11 free throws. While the team's biggest losing streak (done twice) was only 4 games, the team simply could not keep a winning streak longer than three games, with the team being reassured of a below .500 finish after losing on March 13, just nine games before the end of the season. However, the team was in contention for the final spot in the playoffs, with a game versus the Floridians (36–46) in the penultimate game for both teams (played on March 28) that could seal the spot up, as the Condors had a 35–47 record. However, they lost 130–117 to the Floridians, sealing their fate. Two days later, their season ended, with Pittsburgh having missed a playoff berth for another consecutive year. They finished 5th in points scored, with a 119.1 points per game average. Conversely, they finished 8th in points allowed at 121.8 points per game.

Roster  
 22 Walker Banks - Center
 23/40 John Brisker - Small forward
 21 Charles Hentz - Point forward
 15 Rich Johnson - Center
 13 Stew Johnson - Point forward
 22 Arvesta Kelly - Guard
 12 Joe Kennedy - Small forward
 33 Dave Lattin - Point forward
 -- Harry Laurie - Guard
 24 Mike Lewis - Center
 15 Ken Spain - Center
 23 Skeeter Swift - Shooting guard
 25 George Thompson - Shooting guard
 32 Samuel Watts - Shooting guard
 14 Hubie White - Shooting guard
 10/44 Charles Williams - Point guard
 -- Chuck Williams - Point guard
 14 Jim Wilson - Guard

Final standings

Eastern Division

Awards and honors
1971 ABA All-Star Game selections (game played on January 23, 1971)
 John Brisker
 Mike Lewis

References

 Condors on Basketball Reference

External links
 RememberTheABA.com 1970-71 regular season and playoff results
 Condors page

Pittsburgh Condors seasons
Pittsburgh
Pittsburg
Pittsburg